Time on in Australian rules football is the portion of each quarter allocated for extra play which could not occur due to time being stopped.

Each quarter has a specific length of playing time, which can vary in different forms of the game, but at senior level is usually 20 minutes. When the umpire stops play for a score, injury, the blood rule, to award a 50-metre penalty or to reset play for a mark or free kick, he raises one hand above his head and blows his whistle; this is called blowing time off. This tells the timekeeper to stop his clock and stop counting down playing time. When the umpire again raises his hand and blows his whistle, called blowing time on, or when the ball is bounced or thrown in, the timekeeper starts his clock again.

Time on was first introduced to the Laws of the Game by the Australian National Football Council for the 1928 season. From 1928 until 1994, quarters lasted 25 minutes playing time, and time on was called only for scores and injuries; the rule of thumb was that there would be roughly one minute of time-on for every goal scored. From 1994, the AFL Commission adopted the shorter 20 minute quarter, and introduced time-on for many other stoppages, including a ball-up or boundary throw-in.

The timekeeper's twenty-minute count-down clock is not displayed at a football game. Rather, a count-up clock is displayed, which is not stopped when the umpire blows time off. As such, patrons and players at a football game never know exactly when the siren is going to sound, which makes close games particularly tense. Typically, a twenty-minute quarter will last between 27 and 33 minutes; the time period between the 20 minute mark and the siren is referred to as time on. The coaches' boxes and television networks are provided with a feed to the timekeeper's count-down clock in professional games.

If the umpire has blown time off to reset a free kick, the player cannot take his free kick until the time has been blown back on, in fairness to the defending team. Often, in his haste to move the ball quickly to an open teammate, a player will take a kick before time is blown on; in these circumstances, the umpire is forced to call the ball back and force the player to take another kick.

References

Australian rules football terminology
Laws of Australian rules football